The  was a senior commander of the ships of the line of the navy of the Republic of Venice.

History and functions
The Venetian navy had traditionally been a galley-based force. The first organized tactical formations of sailing ships began being formed in the late 15th century.

During the 17th century sailing ships of the line began to play a more important role and comprised a larger and larger portion of the Venetian battle fleet, particularly during the War of Candia.

At the outbreak of the Morean War in 1684 the Republic mobilized 24 sailing ships along with 30 galleys, and during that conflict and the subsequent Seventh Ottoman–Venetian War, the sailing ships played the main role in fleet actions.

The post of  remained the highest peacetime rank for the commanders of the sailing fleet. Appointment to the post was usually for three years. As distinctive signs, the flagship of the  carried a single lantern aft, the standard of Saint Mark on the starboard side aft, and on the mainmast a square ensign of Saint Mark.

References

Sources
 
 

Republic of Venice admirals
Military ranks of the Venetian navy
15th-century establishments in the Republic of Venice